LL77 is the solo debut album by Lisa Lisa, released in 1994.

Production
The album was produced by Guru, Nona Hendryx, and Junior Vasquez, among others. It was Lisa's intention to move away from the Latin bubblegum style of her past by crafting a harder-sounding record.

Critical reception
Rolling Stone wrote that "the songs, along with dependably crunchy rhythms, give up nifty pop hooks." Entertainment Weekly called the album "all atmosphere and no guts," writing that "no matter how sultry the drumbeats, Lisa Lisa’s voice is too thin to provide much soul." The New York Times deemed it "brave, flawed and, at moments, brilliant."

Track listing
"Why Can't Lovers"
"I'm Open"
"The Great Pretender"
"Skip to My Lu"
"Covers"
"Mr. Jimmy"
"Knockin' Down the Walls"
"When I Fell in Love"
"Acid Rain"
"If This Is Real"
"Make It Right"
"Same Old Thing"

Singles

References

1994 debut albums
EMI Records albums
Pendulum Records albums]
Albums produced by Guru